The Volkswagen Amarok is a pickup truck produced by Volkswagen Commercial Vehicles since 2010. It is a body-on-frame truck with double-wishbone suspension at the front and leaf springs at the rear. The Amarok range consists of single cab and double cab, combined with either rear-wheel drive or 4motion four-wheel-drive, and is powered by turbocharged petrol or turbocharged direct injection (TDI) diesel engines.

Amarok competes in some global markets with comparable mid-size pickup trucks, such as the Toyota Hilux, Nissan Navara, Mitsubishi L200, Ford Ranger, Isuzu D-Max and Chevrolet/Holden Colorado/S-10. The second-generation Amarok is based on the Ford Ranger.

Between 2010 and 2022, 830,000 units of the first-generation Amarok has been sold.

The name Amarok, referencing a wolf deity in Inuit mythology, was chosen by brand marketing consultants Interbrand; Interbrand also claims the name is associated with the phrase "he loves stones" in Romanic languages in an attempt to allude to the all-terrain performance of the vehicle.



First generation (2010) 
The Amarok, the first pickup from Volkswagen Commercial Vehicles, was presented to the general public in General Pacheco, Argentina, on 7 January 2010. The project dates back from 2005, when Volkswagen Commercial Vehicles announced their intent to build a robust pickup and off-road family of vehicles. It was teased as the Robust Pick-Up concept in September 2008, wrapped in a search and rescue (SAR) vehicle color scheme; the design was said to be 95 percent resembling the production version.

Following the launch in Argentina, the Amarok was a key support vehicle in the 2010 Dakar Rally, with 45 having been used.

The Amarok is currently being produced in the Volkswagen Group plant in General Pacheco, Argentina; for South American, Mexican, Oceanian, South African, Russian, and European markets. It is expected to produce 90,000 Amaroks annually once production is at full capacity. As of 2022, 70% of the Argentine Amaroks are exported.

The Hanover site was originally dropped from possible sites to produce the Amarok due to the global financial crisis and increasing economic costs in Europe in 2009. In September 2010, it was decided that 40,000 Amarok pickups will also be produced annually in Hanover, Germany for the European and small volume markets from mid-2012.

The 100,000th Amarok was produced on 8 October 2011.

Powertrain 
The Amarok is powered by a range of turbocharged direct injection (TDI) common rail diesel engines, and fuel stratified injection (FSI) petrol engine.

As of the 2012 Model Year, Volkswagen has introduced two more engine configurations, 2.0L TDI 90 kW motor upgraded to 103 kW of power and a 2.0L Bi-TDI which has an optional 8-speed ZF engineered automatic transmission.

On 22 September 2014, Volkswagen launched a limited edition Amarok Dark Label model.

For the 2017 model year, Volkswagen announced a facelifted Amarok range. The key feature of the facelift is a new engine that replaces the earlier models' 2.0L TDI engine. In place of the previous four-cylinder engine, the Amarok is now fitted with a version of VW's 3.0L TDI V6. In the UK the lowest power output was dropped in favour of the 201 and 254 BHP models, the latter has an overboost to 268 and can hit 62 from a standstill in 7.4 seconds.

The new V6 TDI offers up to 23% more power and 28% more torque while delivering lower emissions and decreased fuel consumption compared to the previous 2.0 BiTDI engine that was previously the most powerful option. Deliveries of the new Amarok V6 TDI were scheduled to commence in the 3rd quarter of 2016. In late 2018 a more powerful version of the 3.0 V6 TDI was produced (190/200 kW & 580 Nm) to compete with the new Mercedes Benz X Class V6 CDI.

Driveline 

The Amarok has three drive concepts: rear wheel drive, Shiftable 4Motion and Permanent 4Motion.The Shiftable all wheel drive system can shift drive between the axles whereas the permanent full-time all wheel drive system distributes power through a torque sensing (Torsen) differential with a 40:60 ratio between the front and rear axles.

Low-range gearbox 
In an exclusive release, Volkswagen Australia launched the Amarok V6 Core in January 2020: the only Amarok model to feature a true low-range transfer case (as opposed to the AWD 4Motion system typically employed). Compared to the 4Motion system, the low-range gearbox provides proper low-speed crawling ability and an overall much more rugged driveline for the type of off-roading that is common in Australia. The transfer case is paired only with the 6-speed manual gearbox and the 3.0 V6 TDI engine.

Safety 
In November 2010, the Amarok was awarded 4 stars from Euro NCAP under the 2010/2011 standard crash testing procedure. Testing showed varying degrees of safety for occupants depending on the crash encountered. In February 2011, it received 5 stars from the Australasian New Car Assessment Program (ANCAP).

Adult occupants 
In a frontal impact, the cabin remained stable, and protection for the head, legs, knees and femurs was rated as "good". However, the chest of the passenger was only rated as "adequate" and the driver was only rated as "marginal". Similarly, the side impact test showed good cabin stability in a side barrier impact (designed to replicate side-impact by another car), however the much more challenging side pole test demonstrated significant issues with passenger safety.

The side pole test showed significant force transferred into the dummy's ribs resulting in weak protection. Testers also noted that force was transmitted into the dummy in a way which would not be handled by a human, resulting in a minimum marks awarded for chest protection in a side impact.

Whiplash protection was rated as "marginal".

Child occupants 
The Volkswagen Amarok provided good protection for child occupants with testers noting that children were kept within their restraints well during side impacts, giving a "good" rating for containment. Vertical acceleration of the dummies' chests was higher than recommended in the frontal impact, resulting in a poor rating for frontal impact chest protection.

The Amarok features ISOFIX anchorages and the passenger airbag can be disabled for young children in carseats.

Pedestrians 
Pedestrian impacts were rated as predominately good for areas adults would most likely impact, however protection was poor for children. Leg protection received full marks.

Safety assistance 
The Amarok features electronic stability control (ESC), Anti-lock braking (ABS), Brake Force Assist and Trailer Sway Control. It does however lack more advanced features found on newer vehicles such as autonomous braking, blind-spot monitoring and lane-keep assist. Many of these newer features are more commonly found on cars and SUVs and are only slowly becoming the norm on utility vehicles, as such they may be fitted to future models of the Amarok following a redesign / facelift of the model but are not considered commonplace.

Lack of rear airbags 
The first-generation Amarok was one of the only pickups available on the market which features no airbags whatsoever for rear passengers. Volkswagen stated this was due to testing standards at the time of development not requiring testing for safety of rear passengers, so they omitted airbags and developed a more advanced side crash cell instead. However, this feature omission is notably outdated and outperformed by most other modern vehicles on the market today where airbags are expected as standard for all standard passengers, regardless of seat or vehicle type. A side pole test carried out on the rear passenger would likely result in significant injury to the head and chest of the rear passenger on the impacted side.

NCAP has since changed their testing standards and the Amarok was downgraded from its initial 5-star safety rating to 4-stars.

Brakes 
The Latin American Amarok V6 has ventilated front disc brakes and solid ones in the rear.

Availability 
The first-generation Amarok was available in Argentina, Australia, Brazil, Chile, Colombia, Costa Rica, Ecuador, Peru, Paraguay, Mexico, Mongolia, New Zealand, South Africa, and throughout Europe and South America. VW met with Canadian and American dealerships in 2012 to talk about introducing the pickup to those markets. For the U.S., it would likely necessitate moving production or building a plant somewhere in North America, to avoid the chicken tax enacted to light commercial vehicles.

Variants 

The Amarok was launched in a Double Cab variant with the Single Cab first launching in late 2011 in South Africa and Europe.

Core V6 Low-Range

Currently offered exclusive on the Australian market since early 2020, the Core V6 (also called TDI500 Core) is the only Amarok variant in the world to feature a true low-range transfer case. The Core V6 low-range was a result of strong lobbying by Volkswagen Australia to the parent organisation; citing strong demand from consumers, coupled with Australia being the number one importer of V6 Amaroks as rationale for the decision.

The Amarok has been often criticised for its lack of a low-range 4WD transfer case which is less complex and much more widely preferred in the off-road community for the design's reliability and strength in more extreme off-road duties, than AWD systems such as 4Motion.

The engine of the TDI500 Core is de-rated to 500Nm of torque (hence the TDI500 designation) to suit the 6 speed manual transmission. This new model is considered a base model and as such features cloth seating and lacks carpet, instead opting for rubber flooring. However, it still retains several 'premium' features such as a leather-wrapped steering wheel, 17-inch alloy wheels and a touchscreen infotainment system with Apple CarPlay and Android Auto functionality.

There is also an additional variant, named the Core V6 Enduro which features primarily aesthetic enhancements such as a sports bar and decals in addition to the low-range transfer case. Interestingly, this variant is offered for the same price as the standard Core V6 manual.
 XL +31 CM
 XXL

 Chassis cab
In 2006 the Australian publication Transport Today reported that Phil Clark, Volkswagen Commercial Vehicles Director in Australia, was trying to persuade Volkswagen's head office to add a chassis cab programme to Project RPU.

Cab Chassis variants of both the Single Cab and Double Cab will launch with the 2012 Model Year range.

Amarok Sochi Special Edition

The official vehicle of the 2014 Winter Olympics, the Amarok Sochi Special Edition was available only in Russia. It adds extra exterior chrome trim, a navigation system and an updated interior.

Amarok Polar Expedition

The Polar Expedition variant was designed to promote the 2014 Sochi Winter Olympic Games in the remote areas of Russia.
The team of 9 earned the Guinness World Record for the longest off-road journey through one country. The team took 66 days to reach Kamchatka from Moscow by driving over the glacier-covered Sredinny Range and were the first people to do so. The specially built Amaroks received a couple of upgrades to take on the cold and road less wilderness. The team replaced the front and rear suspension with long-travel, heavy-duty shocks and massive tires with deeper ridges for extra traction in deep snow and ice. The body was unmodified except for cutting out the fenders to fit the wheels and tires. The 2.0L turbo diesel engine remained mostly unmodified because the goal was reliability. For added safety, the interior was fitted with a roll cage and navigation equipment to make sure the team didn't get lost.

Spin-offs
Rumoured platform spin-offs include a five to seven seat SUV to compete with Nissan Xterra and Toyota Hilux SW4 to be built in Brazil for the South American and European markets.

The Dutch Ministry of Defence has announced plans to phase out other vehicles, including the Mercedes-Benz G-Wagen, in favour of the Amarok to move to a single type of truck for peacetime operations. The stated aims for this plan are to purchase 1,667 new vehicles for the Army, the Navy, the Air Force, and the Marechaussee.

Awards 
Auto Esporte – Pickup of the Year 2011 (Brazil)
 Safest Pickup 2011
Auto Test – Cruze, Uno and Amarok, the best of the year according to Auto Test (Argentina)
Parabrisas – Pickup of the Year 2011 (Argentina)
MotorTransport – International Pickup Truck of the Year (UK)
OFF ROAD – Pickup of the Year 2011 (Germany)
Magazin Jäger – Goldenen Keiler (Golden Boar) Best Hunting Car (Germany)
ROAD – Russian Automobile Dealers Golden Klaxon – Special Vehicles Class (Russia)
What Van? – Pickup of the Year 2012 (UK)
4X4 Australia – Ute of the Year 2011 (Australia)
Delivery – Ute of the Year 2011 (Australia)
Zoo Magazine – Manliest Motor of the Year 2011 (UK)
British Insurance Vehicle Security Awards – Best Pickup of the Year 2011 (UK)
Motoring.com.au 2017 Dual-Cab Ute Comparison Winner
Stuff Motoring New Zealand Top Pick-up of 2017
Tow Car Awards 1,900 kg+ & Best Pick-up Winner 2018
International Ute of the Year 2018

Search and Rescue Pickup concept 

SAR Pickup concept also was equipped for Lifeguards with: four mobile CB radios, flashlights, first aid kit with a defibrillator, binoculars, two safety helmets, removable neoprene seats for hard wearing, and a blue light roof module with integrated searchlight.

Possible production features that were on the concept: radio navigation system controlled by a multifunction touch screen, differential locks, cable winch and the rear logo opens the tailgate.

Second generation (2022) 

The second-generation Amarok was released on 7 July 2022. Designed and conceived in Germany and Australia, it will be built by Ford at South African assembly plant in Silverton and share the new Ford Ranger's platform as part of the 2019 Ford-VW global alliance cooperation agreement.

A four-door double cab and two-door single cab body styles are available in this generation. The vehicle is  longer than its predecessor, with  longer wheelbase which provides more room, on the double cab's second row seat.

During its introduction, the second-generation Amarok was introduced with five variants. The base version is the 'Amarok', followed by the 'Life' and 'Style'. Two flagship variants is offered as the PanAmericana (with an off-road-inspired styling) and Aventura (with an on-road-oriented styling).

Powertrain 
Four turbo-diesel (TDI) engines and one turbocharged petrol (TSI) engine is available for the second-generation Amarok, all of which are developed by Ford. In several African markets, the base specification engine is offered, which is a 2.0-litre four-cylinder TDI producing .

The  Amarok diesel is equipped with a standard 10-speed automatic gearbox paired with a e-shifter (shift-by-wire). There are 6-speed automatic transmission and 5- or 6-speed manual gearboxes for other engines.

Production and sales

References

External links

Amarok – Volkswagen Commercial Vehicles US
Amarok – Volkswagen Commercial Vehicles UK
Amarok Double Cab – Volkswagen South Africa

Amarok
Pickup trucks
Euro NCAP pick-ups
Cars introduced in 2010